The Museo Arte Gallarate or MAGA is a museum of modern and contemporary art in Gallarate, in the province of Varese in Lombardy in northern Italy. It was founded in 1966 as the Civica Galleria d'Arte Moderna di Gallarate to house works purchased from, and donated by, artists participating in the Premio Gallarate, a national art competition. It was renamed in 2010 and moved to a new building.

History 

The Civica Galleria d'Arte Moderna di Gallarate was founded in 1966 to house works acquired – either by donation or by purchase – from the first eight editions of the Premio Gallarate (in full, the Premio Nazionale Arti Visive Città di Gallarate), which had been founded sixteen years earlier, in 1950. The GAM became a nationally recognized museum at the beginning of the 1980s.

On March 19, 2010, the grand opening of the current Museo MAGA began with an exhibition dedicated to Amedeo Modigliani. The newly relocated museum was given the name Museo MAGA upon moving to its newly constructed premises. The modern makeover was completed to create a relationship with younger visitors and a more contemporary approach to the appreciation of the arts.   In November 2015, the Museo MAGA expanded into Palazzo Leone da Perego in the center of Legnano, Lombardy, Italy.

The main building 

The museum provides a space on the first floor for educational and artistic workshops. The museum is used as a study area by teenagers and adults. It offers wi-fi and a bar.

Palazzo Leone Da Perego 

This structure was built in the second half of the thirteenth century by an Archiepiscopal Court. Two important buildings were built on the ruins of the castle of Cotta by the Archbishops of Milan: The Palace of Leone da Perego and The Palace of Ottone Visconti. The Archbishop's residences surrounded both buildings. In 2016, little remains of the original building due to radical restorations since 1898.

European Photograph Festival 

MAGA hosted the European Photograph Festival in Pallazo Leone da Perego of Legnano, from 5 March to 10 April 2016. This exhibition was organized by Claudio Argentiero, and exhibited art pieces both from national and international photographers, including: Michael Akerman, Raffaele Montepaone, Giovanni Sesia, Giovanni Mereghetti and Cecile Decorniquet. This exhibition developed Palazzo Leone da Perego as a regional focal point for artistic photography.

CAM (Concrete Art Movement)

This project is dedicated to “The harmony of the form, Angelo Bozzola and the Concrete Art Movement (1948-1958)”. The exhibition is dedicated to the CAM because the MAGA museum has the historic archive and the important collection that belongs to the Foundation of Angelo Bozzola of Galliate. In the Palazzo Leone da Perego there are more than 75 art works by the artist Angelo Bozzola, and additional works by Bruno Munari, Gianni Monnet, Gillo Dorfles, Atanasio Soldati, and Augusto Garau.

References 

Art museums and galleries in Lombardy
Modern art museums in Italy
1966 establishments in Italy
Museums established in 1966
Gallarate